Sage Automotive Interiors is a portfolio company of Asahi Kasei and a global supplier of technical textiles for the automotive industry. The company develops and produces automotive interior surfaces such as seating, door panels and automobile headliners that are used in cars, trucks, SUVs and minivans.

Sage Automotive Interiors specializes in eco-friendly fabric design, engineering and manufacturing. With corporate headquarters located on the campus of Clemson University International Center for Automotive Research in Greenville, South Carolina USA, Sage operates 22 design and support facilities in 18 countries, with plants in North America, Brazil, China, Japan, India, Thailand, Europe and Korea, and employees over 2,000 people.

History 
Sage Automotive Interiors was established in 1948 as Milliken Automotive Division. In the 1970s, the company became the first supplier to develop double-needle bar fabrics, acquiring Chrysler as a new U.S. customer and launching an export business with Japanese automakers Honda and Toyota. In 1984–85, the company began producing fabrics in North America for Honda and Toyota.

Throughout the 1980s and 1990s, Milliken Automotive Division opened two new manufacturing facilities and added Nissan and Hyundai as customers. In 1996, the company opened a facility in Brazil and added Fiat and Volkswagen to its customer list.

Sage Automotive Interiors was officially established in 2009 by former Milliken & Co. executives. Throughout the 2000s, Sage invested in new technology for yarn manufacturing, texturing, knitting, coating and face finishing, and in 2011, invested in weaving technology that allowed Sage to expand into the automotive headliners market. In 2013, Sage established a location in China, acquired a facility in Poland and opened a facility in Mexico. And in 2014, Sage expanded into the premium seating market. In 2018, Sage was acquired by Asahi Kasei.

References 

Automotive companies of the United States